The Nonnenbach is a seven-kilometre-long tributary of the Ahr in the area of Blankenheim in the district of Euskirchen in the German state of North Rhine-Westphalia.

Geography

Course 
The source of the Nonnenbach lies in woods about 2 kilometres east of  Schmidtheim, on the far side of the B 51 and not far from gravel pits already partly filled with groundwater. It flows past the eponymous village and empties into the Ahr a good 2 kilometres south of Blankenheim. Apart from the Seidenbach and the Günzelbach it is also fed during its short course by the streams of numerous gullies, known locally as Seifen.

Tributaries 
Mittlerer Seifen (left)
Seidenbach (left), 2.0 km
Günzelbach (left), 1.8 km
Wallbach (left), 1.8 km

See also
List of rivers of North Rhine-Westphalia

References 

Rivers of North Rhine-Westphalia
Rivers of the Eifel
Rivers of Germany